, son of regent Tsunenori and adopted son of Kujō Tadamoto, was a kugyō or Japanese court noble of the Muromachi period (1336–1573). He held a regent position kampaku from 1418-1424. Masatada and Masamoto were his sons.

Family
 Father: Kujō Tsunenori
 Foster Father: Kujō Tadamoto
 Wife: Karahashi Aritoyo’s daughter
 Children:
 Kujō Masatada
 Kujō Masamoto

References
 

1394 births
1449 deaths
Fujiwara clan
Kujō family